The Hoo Hoo Monument on First Street in Gurdon, Arkansas, is a commemoration of the creation of the International Concatenated Order of the Hoo Hoo, a fraternal society of lumbermen founded in Gurdon in 1892.  The granite monument with bronze plaque is located near the site of the Hotel Hall where the Hoo Hoo organization was founded.  The monument was designed in the Egyptian Revival style by George Zolnay and placed in 1909.  The plaque was originally affixed to Hotel Hall, but was moved to the granite marker after the building was demolished in 1927.  The monument is a rare Arkansas work by Zolnay.

The monument was listed on the National Register of Historic Places in 1999.

See also
National Register of Historic Places listings in Clark County, Arkansas

References

Monuments and memorials on the National Register of Historic Places in Arkansas
Buildings and structures completed in 1909
National Register of Historic Places in Clark County, Arkansas
1909 establishments in Arkansas
Relocated buildings and structures in Arkansas
Egyptian Revival architecture in Arkansas